= Schwarzensee (Salzkammergut) =

- Location within Austria
- Location: Upper Austria, Austria
- Coordinates: 47°45′08″N 13°29′42″E
- Type: lake

Schwarzensee is a lake of Upper Austria.
